Carling Zeeman (born May 27, 1991) is a Canadian rower. She competed at several World cups, international events, along with the 2015 Pan American Games. Zeeman is a former world championships silver medallist in the women's quadruple sculls event. More recently she won gold in the women's single sculls at World Rowing Cup I regatta in Varese, Italy, and a silver at the 2017 World Rowing Cup 3 regatta in Lucerne Switzerland.

In June 2016, she was officially named to Canada's 2016 Olympic team.  At the 2016 Summer Olympics Carling placed 10th.

In June 2021, Zeeman was named to her second Olympic team.

References

External links 
 
 

1991 births
Living people
Canadian female rowers
Rowers at the 2015 Pan American Games
Olympic rowers of Canada
World Rowing Championships medalists for Canada
Pan American Games gold medalists for Canada
Rowers at the 2016 Summer Olympics
Pan American Games medalists in rowing
Rowers from Hamilton, Ontario
Medalists at the 2015 Pan American Games
Rowers at the 2020 Summer Olympics
21st-century Canadian women